Semyon Stolbov (born 25 February 2003) is a Russian professional footballer. He plays for Orenburg-2.

References

External links

2003 births
Living people
Russian footballers
Association football midfielders
FC Orenburg players
FC Minsk players
Belarusian Premier League players
Russian Second League players
Russian expatriate footballers
Expatriate footballers in Belarus
Russian expatriate sportspeople in Belarus
Sportspeople from Moscow Oblast